A doubly terminated crystal (or double-terminated crystal) is a crystal with natural faces on both ends.

References 

Crystals